Adis "Baggio" Hušidić (born 19 May 1987) is a Bosnian-American former footballer. He mainly played as a midfielder but was also deployed as a left-back.

Early life

Born in Velika Kladuša, Bosanska Krajina, SR Bosnia, SFR Yugoslavia (present-day Bosnia and Herzegovina), Hušidić and his family fled Bosnia in the mid-1990s to escape the Bosnian War, spending time in a refugee camp in southern Croatia, and living in Hamburg, Germany for several years, before eventually settling in Libertyville, Illinois in 1997.

Career

Youth and college
Hušidić attended Libertyville High School. He also played club soccer for Sockers FC Chicago, who he helped reach state, regional and national championship tournaments. He played college soccer at the University of Illinois at Chicago from 2006 to 2008, where he was named to the Horizon League All-Newcomer Team as a freshman, and to the All-Horizon League First Team as a sophomore in 2007.

Professional

Husidić was drafted in the second round (20th overall) of the 2009 MLS SuperDraft by Chicago Fire, and signed a Generation Adidas contract. He made his professional debut on 28 May 2009, coming on as a late substitute for Gonzalo Segares in a game against Chivas USA. He scored his first career professional goal on 24 April 2010 in a game against Houston Dynamo.

It was announced on 18 November 2010 that Hušidić would graduate from the MLS Generation Adidas program at the end of the 2010 season. Baggio had his breakout season in 2010. He proved to be a vital part of the Fire, scoring goals and filling in voids in the midfield.

Hušidić didn't have a great season in 2011 and received only limited playing time. At season's end, Chicago declined his 2012 contract option and he entered the 2011 MLS Re-Entry Draft. Hušidić was selected by Colorado Rapids in stage 2 of the draft on 12 December 2011. However, Hušidić spurned Colorado and instead signed with Swedish second division side Hammarby IF on 23 December 2011.

Despite still being with Hammarby, LA Galaxy acquired the MLS rights to Hušidić in a trade with Colorado on 17 June 2013. On 11 November 2013, LA Galaxy head coach Bruce Arena confirmed that the team had signed Hušidić from Hammarby.
On 21 May 2016 Husidić was called to join the Bosnian national team for a friendly match with Spain.

Hušidić was released by LA Galaxy at the end of their 2018 season.

He announced his retirement on 7 March 2019.

Style of play
A dynamic, hard-working, intelligent, and tactically versatile player, with good distribution and offensive capabilities, which allows him both to score goals and provide assists, Husidić is capable of playing in any midfield position, both in the centre and out wide, and has also been deployed as a left-back.

Personal life
Hušidić was given the nickname 'Baggio' (after Italian player Roberto Baggio) at a young age by his father. He became a naturalized U.S. citizen while he was in college. An advocate of veganism, Hušidić has said of the benefits of his whole foods, plant-based diet: "I’m able to run the longest distance per game of any player on my team. My recovery rate is much faster. My muscles recover much quicker than most other players. My energy level is high; I nap once a year. I sleep very well, averaging around  hours a night. I’m always happy, I have clear skin and no body odor, and I rarely ever get ill. I could go on and on."

Honors

Club
LA Galaxy
MLS Cup: 2014

References

External links
 

1987 births
Living people
All-American men's college soccer players
American expatriate soccer players
American expatriate sportspeople in Sweden
American soccer players
Association football midfielders
Bosnia and Herzegovina emigrants to the United States
Bosnia and Herzegovina expatriate sportspeople in Sweden
Bosnia and Herzegovina expatriate footballers
Bosnia and Herzegovina footballers
Chicago Fire FC draft picks
Chicago Fire FC players
Expatriate footballers in Sweden
Hammarby Fotboll players
LA Galaxy players
LA Galaxy II players
Major League Soccer players
People from Libertyville, Illinois
People from Velika Kladuša
Soccer players from Illinois
Superettan players
UIC Flames men's soccer players
USL Championship players
Saint Mary's Gaels men's soccer coaches
San Francisco Dons men's soccer coaches